The second USS  Chimo (ACM-1) was the lead ship of her class of minelayers in the United States Navy during World War II.

Chimo was built as USAMP Colonel Charles W. Bundy for the U.S. Army Mine Planter Service by Marietta Manufacturing Co., Point Pleasant, West Virginia; converted at Norfolk Navy Yard; acquired by the U.S. Navy on 7 April 1944; commissioned the same day and reported to the Atlantic Fleet.

Service history

Normandy invasion operations
Chimo sailed from Norfolk on 13 May 1944 for Plymouth and the Normandy beaches. She lay at anchor off Utah Beach from 7 to 19 June as flagship of Commander Minesweepers West, providing tender services to British and United States minesweeping forces as they kept lanes open for the movement of supplies vital to the invasion buildup. Between 20 June 1944 and 5 March 1945, Chimo operated from Plymouth along the coast of France at Cherbourg, bay of Saint-Brieuc, and Brest. She cleared Plymouth on 5 March for overhaul in the States and on 11 June, departed Norfolk arriving at San Diego on 3 July for voyage repairs and training.

Pacific Ocean operations
In mid-September 1945, Chimo began duty off Eniwetok, Saipan, and Okinawa until 1 February 1946, when she put into Sasebo. Chimo cleared Sasebo on 10 March for Saipan, Eniwetok, Pearl Harbor, and San Francisco, arriving 16 April.

Decommissioning
Chimo was decommissioned 21 May 1946, transferred to the War Shipping Administration and sold 28 September 1948. The ship was sold 1963 to become tuna seiner MV Day Island.

Chimo received two battle stars for World War II service.

References

External links
 NavSource Online: Mine Warfare Vessel Photo Archive – USS Chimo (ACM 1) – ex-USAMP Colonel Charles W. Bundy
 Ships of the U.S. Navy, 1940–1945 ACM-1 USS Chimo

Mine planters of the United States Army
Chimo-class minelayers
1943 ships
Ships built in Point Pleasant, West Virginia